The Hangzhou–Taizhou high-speed railway is a high-speed railway in China. It was opened on 8 January 2022.

Description
The railway does not parallel any existing railway.

The railway is the first privately funded Chinese high-speed railway, while a consortium led by Fosun Group provided 51% of the funds.

Features
The Hangzhou–Taizhou high-speed railway uses the inner two tracks.

 Dongming Tunnel is the longest high-speed railway tunnel in East China.

Stations
It has the following stations:

References

High-speed railway lines in China
Railway lines opened in 2022